Marie Royce, born as Marie Therese Porter, is an American businesswoman, diplomat, and educator. She was the Assistant Secretary of State for Educational and Cultural Affairs from 2018-2021. She was nominated by President Donald Trump and was unanimously confirmed by the US Senate.

Education
Royce graduated from California State Polytechnic University, Pomona with a bachelor of science degree in marketing management and management human resources, and she earned a MBA in international business from Georgetown University in 1996.

Career
Royce was a faculty member at California State Polytechnic University, Pomona. Working in the private sector for over 30 years, Royce held senior management positions at Marriott International, Choice Hotels International, Procter & Gamble, and Alcatel-Lucent.

She served as a private sector appointee on the Advisory Committee on International Communications and Information Policy (ACICIP) at the U.S. Department of State.

Awards 
Royce was selected as an American Council of Young Political Leaders (ACYPL) delegate to Hungary and Poland and received the ACYPL Honors Award in 2018. The American Women for International Understanding (AWIU) recognized her with their Internationalism Award in 2013. In 1994, Royce was Cal Poly Pomona's Distinguished Alumna for the College of Business and their Commencement Speaker. 

In 2019, Royce was decorated with the “Order of Civil Merit, Commander by Number,” by Felipe VI. In October 2020, Royce was recognized with an Honorary Doctor Causa from the University of Tirana in Albania. Royce was recently honored by her high school alma mater, Pomona Catholic, with their Pillar of Scholarship Distinguished Alumna Award.

In April of 2021, Royce joined the USC Center of Public Diplomacy as a member of their Board of Advisors. Royce was also honored by the Congressional Families Cancer Prevention Program part of the Prevent Cancer Foundation, with the Congressional Families Leadership Award, as a longstanding member of the Congressional Families Executive Council and supporter of both program and Foundation-wide events.

In September 2021, Royce, was honored with the 2021 Career Achievement Award at the 2021 Professional Fraternity Association Conference in Irving, Texas for her service as the former Assistant Secretary of State for Educational and Cultural Affairs. The Career Achievement Award is the highest level of recognition given by the Professional Fraternity Association, which represents over 100,000 undergraduate and graduate students on over 1,000 college campuses across the nation. Royce has been active with the co-ed professional fraternity Pi Sigma Epsilon, one of the 30 fraternal member groups represented by PFA that has collectively initiated 2.5 million members in professional fields. Royce was selected for her career achievements in the private sector, her philanthropic work at the US Department of State, and her continued involvement over the past 40 years.

Personal life 
She is married to Ed Royce, a former member of the United States House of Representatives.

References

Living people
Assistant Secretaries of State for Education and Culture
California State Polytechnic University, Pomona alumni
Georgetown University alumni
Trump administration personnel
Year of birth missing (living people)
American diplomats
American women diplomats